Mary Givens Bryan (September 3, 1910 – July 28, 1964) was an American archivist and the director of the Georgia Department of Archives and History.

Bryan was born in La Grange, Georgia in 1910, and raised in Decatur outside of Atlanta. She attended Emory University and the Women's College of Georgia before joining the staff of the Department of Archives and History, where she worked her way from the position of clerk to director and state archivist over the course of a thirty-year career. During her tenure as director she advocated for the construction of a state archives building, which was completed a year after her death in October 1965.

Bryan was an active member of the Society of American Archivists, serving as a member of Council (1957–1958) and as president of the organization (1959–1960).

In 2021 Bryan was added to the Georgia Women of Achievement hall of fame.

References

1910 births
1964 deaths
Emory University alumni
American archivists
Female archivists
Presidents of the Society of American Archivists